Wydra is a Polish surname meaning "otter". Notable people with the surname include:
 Dominik Wydra (born 1994), Austrian footballer
 Harald Wydra, British anthropologist
 Karolina Wydra (born 1981), Polish-American actress
 Szymon Wydra (born 1976), Polish rock vocalist

See also
 

Polish-language surnames